Marko Kartelo (born 16 February 1981) is a Croatian professional football manager and former player who was most recently the manager of Prva HNL club HNK Šibenik.

Playing career

Club
In January 2012, Kartelo terminated his contract with Šibenik through arbitration. In February 2012 he signed a sixth-month contract with Israeli club Hapoel Haifa. He later had a spell at German lower league side SV 1910 Neuhof.

Managerial career
Kartelo started his managerial career being appointed head coach of Treća HNL club NK Vodice on 11 November 2019. On 2 January 2020, he was fired from the club and replaced by Boris Pavić.

On 12 February 2022 following the sacking of Ferdo Milin after 0–5 home defeat to Hrvatski Dragovoljac, Kartelo was appointed caretaker manager of Prva HNL club HNK Šibenik. On 20 February, he led his first game as Šibenik manager, which the club lost to Rijeka 2–4. On 27 February, Kartelo led Šibenik to a 2–1 home win against Istra 1961.

On 3 March 2022, Šibenik confirmed that Kartelo would remain the head coach as a long-time solution. A day later, just a day before the league game against Dinamo Zagreb, Kartelo was sacked as the head coach by the club.

Managerial statistics

References

External links

1981 births
Living people
Sportspeople from Šibenik
Association football defenders
Croatian footballers
Croatia youth international footballers
Croatia under-21 international footballers
HNK Šibenik players
Győri ETO FC players
NK Zagreb players
Hapoel Haifa F.C. players
HNK Primorac Biograd na Moru players
Croatian Football League players
Nemzeti Bajnokság I players
Israeli Premier League players
Croatian expatriate footballers
Expatriate footballers in Hungary
Croatian expatriate sportspeople in Hungary
Expatriate footballers in Israel
Croatian expatriate sportspeople in Israel
Expatriate footballers in Germany
Croatian expatriate sportspeople in Germany
Croatian football managers
HNK Šibenik managers